18-Deoxyaldosterone is a steroidal antimineralocorticoid with mixed agonist–antagonist but predominantly antagonistic activity at the mineralocorticoid receptor.

References

Primary alcohols
Antimineralocorticoids
Diketones
Pregnanes
Enones